Galesburg is a city in Knox County, Illinois, United States. At the 2010 census, its population was 32,195. It is the county seat of Knox County and the principal city of the Galesburg Micropolitan Statistical Area, which includes all of Knox and Warren counties.

Galesburg is home to Knox College, a private four-year liberal arts college, and Carl Sandburg College, a two-year community college.

A  section of the city is listed on the National Register of Historic Places as the Galesburg Historic District.

History
Galesburg was founded by George Washington Gale, a Presbyterian minister from New York state who had formulated the concept of the manual labor college and first implemented it at the Oneida Institute near Utica, New York. In 1836 Gale publicized a subscription- and land purchase-based plan to found manual labor colleges in the Mississippi River valley. Land was purchased for this purpose in Knox County and in 1837 the first subscribers to the college-founding plan arrived and began to settle what would become Galesburg.

Galesburg, populated from the first by abolitionists, was home to one of the first anti-slavery societies in Illinois and was a stop on the Underground Railroad. The city was the site of the fifth Lincoln–Douglas debate. held on October 7, 1858. Galesburg also was the home of Mary Ann "Mother" Bickerdyke, who provided hospital care for Union soldiers during the Civil War.

In later years, Galesburg became the birthplace of poet Carl Sandburg, artist Dorothea Tanning, and former Major League Baseball star Jim Sundberg. Sandburg's boyhood home is maintained by the Illinois Historic Preservation Agency as the Carl Sandburg State Historic Site. It includes the cottage he was born in, a modern museum, the rock under which he and his wife Lilian are buried, and a performance venue.

Throughout much of its history, Galesburg has been inextricably tied to the railroad industry. Local businessmen were major backers of the first railroad to connect Illinois's then two biggest cities—Chicago and Quincy—as well as a third leg initially terminating across the Mississippi River from Burlington, Iowa, eventually connecting to it via bridge and thence onward to the Western frontier. The Chicago, Burlington and Quincy Railroad (CB&Q) sited major rail sorting yards here, including the first to use hump sorting. The CB&Q also built a major depot on South Seminary Street that was controversially torn down and replaced by a much smaller station in 1983. The yard is still used by the BNSF Railway.

In the late 19th century, when the Atchison, Topeka and Santa Fe Railway connected its service through to Chicago, it also laid track through Galesburg and built its own railroad depot. The depot remained in operation until the construction of the Cameron Connector southwest of town enabled Amtrak to reroute the Southwest Chief via the Mendota Subdivision and join the California Zephyr and Illinois Zephyr at the Burlington Northern depot. A series of mergers eventually united both lines under the ownership of BNSF Railway, carrying an average of seven freight trains per hour between them. With the closure of the Maytag plant in 2004, BNSF is once again the largest private employer in Galesburg.

Galesburg was home to the pioneering brass era automobile company Western, which produced the Gale, named for the town.

Galesburg was home to minor league baseball from 1890 to 1914. The Galesburg Pavers was the last name of the minor league teams based in Galesburg. Galesburg teams played as members of the Eastern Iowa League (1895), Central Interstate League (1890), Illinois-Iowa League (1890),  Illinois-Missouri League (1908–1909) and Central Association (1910–1912, 1914).

Baseball Hall of Fame members Grover Cleveland Alexander (1909) and Sam Rice (1912) played for Galesburg. Rice had to leave the Galseburg team in 1912, when his wife, two children, his parents and two sisters were killed in a tornado. Galesburg teams played at Illinois Field (1908–1912, 1914), Lombard College Field (1908–1912, 1914) and Willard Field at Knox College (1890, 1895).

Lombard College was in Galesburg until 1930, and is now the site of Lombard Middle School.

The Carr Mansion at 560 North Prairie Street was the site of a presidential cabinet meeting held in 1899 by U.S. President William McKinley and U.S. Secretary of State John Hay.

Geography
Galesburg is in western Knox County at  (40.952292, -90.368545). Interstate 74 runs through the east side of the city, leading southeast  to Peoria and north  to Interstate 80 near the Quad Cities area.

Climate

Transportation
Amtrak, the national passenger rail system, provides service from Chicago on four trains daily. It operates the California Zephyr,  Carl Sandburg, Illinois Zephyr, and Southwest Chief daily from Chicago Union Station to Galesburg station and points west. The Southwest Chief and the state-supported Carl Sandburg and Illinois Zephyr take passengers to Chicago or points west, while the California Zephyr discharges passengers only on its eastbound run since the other trains provide ample service.

Galesburg Transit provides bus service in the city. There are four routes: Gold Express Loop, Green Central Loop, Red West Loop, and Blue East Loop.

Galesburg is served by Interstate 74, which runs north to Moline in the Quad Cities region, and southeast to Peoria and beyond. The Chicago–Kansas City Expressway, also known as Illinois Route 110, runs through Galesburg. To the southwest it passes through Macomb, the home of Western Illinois University, and toward Quincy, before crossing into Missouri. Galesburg served is served by U.S. Routes 34 and 150. US 34 connects Galesburg to Burlington, Iowa, and Chicago. It is a freeway through its entire run in Galesburg and west to Monmouth. It connects to Galesburg through three interchanges at West Main Street, North Henderson Street, and North Seminary Street, along with an additional interchange at Interstate 74. US 150 runs through the heart of Galesburg. It enters the city as Grand Avenue from the southeast, runs through downtown as Main Street, and exits the city as North Henderson Street. Galesburg is additionally served by Illinois State Route 97, Route 41, Route 164, and Knox County highways 1, 7, 9, 10, 25, 30, 31, and 40.

Galesburg Municipal Airport provides general aviation access, while Quad City International Airport and General Wayne A. Downing Peoria International Airport provide commercial flights.

Galesburg will be home to the National Railroad Hall of Fame. Efforts are underway to raise funds for the $30 million project, which got a major boost in 2006, when Congress passed a bill to charter the establishment. It is hoped that the museum will bring tourism and a financial boost to the community. Construction of the museum began in 2019.

Demographics

As of the census of 2000, there were 33,706 people, 13,237 households, and 7,902 families residing in the city. The racial makeup of the city was 84.23% White, 10.20% African American, 0.22% Native American, 1.03% Asian, 0.02% Pacific Islander, 2.46% from other races, and 1.84% from two or more races. Hispanic or Latino of any race were 5.01% of the population. 17.4% were of German, 12.6% American, 11.5% Irish, 11.3% Swedish and 9.1% English ancestry according to Census 2000.

There were 13,237 households, of which 26.3% had children under the age of 18 living with them, 43.6% were married couples living together, 12.4% had a female householder with no husband present, and 40.3% were non-families. 34.6% of all households were made up of individuals, and 16.1% had someone living alone who was 65 years of age or older. The average household size was 2.24 and the average family size was 2.87.

The population was spread out, with 21.1% under the age of 18, 11.8% from 18 to 24, 27.0% from 25 to 44, 22.0% from 45 to 64, and 18.1% 65 or older. The median age was 38. For every 100 females, there were 100.3 males. For every 100 females age 18 and over, there were 98.1 males.

The median income for a household in the city was $31,987, and the median income for a family was $41,796. Males had a median income of $31,698 versus $21,388 for females. The per capita income for the city was $17,214. About 10.7% of families and 14.7% of the population were below the poverty line, including 23.4% of those under age 18 and 6.3% of those age 65 or over.

Festivals
Galesburg is the home of the Railroad Days festival, held on the fourth weekend of June. The festival began in 1977 as an open house to the public from the then Burlington Northern. Burlington Northern gave train car tours of their yards. The city started having street fairs to draw more people to town. In 1981, the Galesburg Railroad Museum was founded and opened during Railroad Days. For a while, the city and the railroad worked together on the celebrations. In 2002, the railroad backed out of the festival and there were no yard tours. In 2003 the city worked with local groups to revamp the festival and the Galesburg Railroad Museum resumed bus tours of the yards. The Galesburg Railroad Museum has continued to provide tours of the yards since then. In 2010, the Galesburg Railroad Museum started offering a VIP tour of the yards, in which a select group of riders are allowed in the Hump Towers and Diesel Shop and see the BNSF at work. During the festival, one of the largest model railroad train shows and layouts in the U.S. Midwest happens during Railroad Days at the new Galesburg High School Fieldhouse.

During Labor Day weekend in September, Galesburg hosts the Stearman Fly in. Also in September are the Great Cardboard Boat Regatta and the Annual Rubber Duck Race, at Lake Storey. On the third weekend of every August, a Civil War and pre-1840s rendezvous is held at Lake Storey Park.

Popular culture

Galesburg is the birthplace of George Washington Gale Ferris Jr., inventor of the Ferris wheel.  
According to legend, the four Marx Brothers (Groucho, Chico, Harpo, and Gummo) first received their nicknames at Galesburg's Gaity Theatre in 1914. Nicknames ending in -o were popular in the early 20th century, and a fellow vaudevillian, Art Fisher, supposedly bestowed them upon the brothers during a poker game there. Zeppo Marx received his nickname later.
Galesburg features prominently in The Mountain Goats' song Weekend in Western Illinois from the album Full Force Galesburg.
Galesburg is mentioned in the book The Prestige.
Writer Jack Finney, author of The Body Snatchers, uses Galesburg as a setting for several of his time-travel tales, including 1957's About Time, in which he uses 941 Willard Street, and 1962's I Love Galesburg in the Springtime.
The 1981 horror film Strange Behavior is set in Galesburg.
Galesburg is mentioned in Stephen King's book Dolores Claiborne.
Galesburg is mentioned in Richard Bach's 1977 novel Illusions: The Adventures of a Reluctant Messiah.
Galesburg and Knox College are both mentioned in Walter Dean Myers's novel Fallen Angels, about the Vietnam War.
An android (impersonating a guest character) in The Six Million Dollar Man episode "Day of the Robot" mentions that "his" father operated a gym in Galesburg.
Barack Obama mentioned Galesburg during his keynote address at the 2004 Democratic National Convention and near the beginning of his 2010 State of the Union Address. Obama also visited Galesburg High School in 2011 to speak to students while in the area for a Midwestern bus tour.
Baseball legend Jimmie Foxx lived out some of his last years as a greeter at a steakhouse in Galesburg. Foxx left just before his death in 1967.
Ronald Reagan attended second grade at Silas Willard Elementary School between 1917 and 1918. He portrayed pitcher Grover Cleveland Alexander in the movie The Winning Team in 1952, starting with Alexander's stint with the minor-league Galesburg Boosters.
Galesburg is the birthplace of artist Stephen Prina, whose recent publication Galesburg, Illinois+ documents an exhibition that portrays the town indirectly through various media.

Notable people

Media
Galesburg has several radio stations and newspapers delivering a mix of local, regional and national news. WGIL-AM, WAAG, WLSR-FM and WKAY-FM are all owned by Galesburg Broadcasting while Prairie Radio Communications owns WAIK-AM. KZZ66 provides Weather Information for NOAA Weather Radio in the Galesburg area.

The Galesburg Register-Mail is the result of the merger of the Galesburg Republican-Register and the Galesburg Daily Mail in 1927. The two papers trace their roots back to the mid-19th century. A daily, it is the main newspaper of the city, and was owned by Copley Press until it was sold to Gate House Media in April 2007. The Zephyr was started in 1989, was published on Thursdays and was the only locally owned newspaper until its final edition December 9, 2010. The New Zephyr began publication in early 2013. It is published every Friday. The Knoxville Bulletin is a weekly newspaper established in May 2016. It is owned by Limestone Publishing.

Galesburg is part of the Quad Cities television market.

FM radio
 90.7 WVKC "Tri States Public Radio", supported by Western Illinois University and Knox College Tri States Public Radio  (NPR Affiliate with HD Radio subchannels)
 92.7 WLSR "92.7 FM The Laser", Active Rock (RDS - Artist/Title)
 94.9 WAAG "FM 95", Country (RDS - Artist/Title)
 95.7 WVCL, Religious, an affiliate of Three Angels Broadcasting Network
 100.5 W263AO (Translates 91.5 WCIC), Christian AC (RDS)
 105.3 WKAY "105.3 KFM", Adult Contemporary (RDS - Artist/Title)

AM radio
 1400 WGIL, News/Talk
 1590 WAIK, News/Talk/Sports

Web radio
 KGB-Radio "Knox Galesburg Radio", Galesburg Area News Weather and Maps

Print
 The Paper, local weekly (free) newspaper (in the Register-Mail every Wednesday)
 Register-Mail, local daily newspaper
 The Zephyr, local weekly newspaper (discontinued in 2010)
 The New Zephyr, local weekly newspaper (on hiatus as of December 2013)
 Knoxville Bulletin, local weekly newspaper (started in May 2016)
 The Burg, local weekly newspaper (started in summer of 2019)

References

Further reading

External links

 Official website
 Community Development Department
 CarlSandburg.net: A Research Website for Sandburg Studies
 Carl Sandburg Historic Site Association
 The Galesburg Project lists famous Galesburgers and visitors. Links to Galesburg history articles
 Galesburg Railroad Days
 Railroads in the Midwest: Early Documents and Images
 Mr. Lincoln and Freedom: Lincoln-Douglas Debate in Galesburg
 1994 reenactment of Lincoln-Douglas Debate in Galesburg televised by C-SPAN (Debate preview and Debate review)
 Galesburg Railroad Museum
 Local papers:
 The Register-Mail (daily)
 The Zephyr (weekly, discontinued 2010)
 The Paper (weekly, free)
 The Burg (weekly)

 
Cities in Illinois
Cities in Knox County, Illinois
Galesburg, Illinois micropolitan area
Populated places on the Underground Railroad
Ronald Reagan Trail
County seats in Illinois
Populated places established in 1836
1836 establishments in Illinois